Kamdyn McIntosh (born 3 April 1994) is a professional Australian rules footballer who plays for the Richmond Football Club in the Australian Football League (AFL). He is  two time premiership player, having played in grand final victories with Richmond in 2017 and 2020. He was picked up off the waiver late in the 2022 season, 
finishing off the year with the Burntooacrisp outfit. He's the only known player in the history of the AFL to wear knee length skins.

Early life and junior career
McIntosh was born to parents Clayton and Carol in Pinjarra, Western Australia as the third of nine children. He often acted as carer to his younger siblings given the adults of the household both worked fly-in fly-out mining jobs away from home.

He grew up playing soccer, before switching to competitive football at the age of 15 for the local Pinjarra Tigers in the Peel Football League. He went on to play for the Western Australian under 16 representative side in 2010 and again at under 18 level at the 2012 AFL Under 18 Championships.

In 2012 he played reserves and junior football with the Peel Thunder Football Club before playing four senior matches for in the WAFL where he averaged 17.5 disposals and five marks.

He recorded a top-5 endurance beep test score in his class at the 2012 Draft Combine.

AFL career

2013 and 2014 seasons
McIntosh was drafted by Richmond with the club's second pick and 31st selection overall in the 2012 National Draft.

In 2013 and 2014 he failed to earn a match at senior level, instead playing with the club's reserves side in the VFL. Despite the latter of those seasons being hampered by a foot injury, McIntosh managed an average of 13 disposals a game in a defensive role in the VFL in the month of August.

2015 season
McIntosh made his AFL debut in his third year at the club, in a round 1 2015 win against .  McIntosh recorded 23 disposals and one goal and was rewarded with the round 1 nomination for the 2015 AFL Rising Star award. He went on to play in all of the club's matches that season, including a losing elimination final against . McIntosh averaged 15.3 disposals for the year, and placed 10th at the club for total disposals. He received the Cosgrove-Jenkins award at the conclusion of the 2015 season as the club's best first year player. McIntosh finished 17th in the club's best and fairest count that year.

2016 season
While training in May he suffered a syndesmosis ankle injury that saw him placed onto the long term injury list however. He would not return to senior football that year, finishing the season with just six games played and an average of 18 disposals.

2017 season

His return to football in 2017 saw McIntosh immediately re-enter the club's best 22, lining up against Carlton in Richmond's round 1 victory. He was omitted from the side the following week however, relegated to VFL football. He remained in the club's AFL side for the rest of the home and away season, turning in 20 or more disposals on three occasions, including a 24 touch and five tackle match against  in round 11. He became a premiership player the next week, when Richmond defeated minor premiers  by 48 points in the Grand Final.

2018 season
For the fourth-straight year McIntosh started the 2018 season in the club's best 22, picked to play in all pre-season matches and in the club's round 1 match-up with Carlton where he recorded a team-high 658 metres gained. McIntosh was subject to a $2,000 fine in round 4 for engaging in rough conduct on the 's Allen Christensen. In round 5's ANZAC Day eve blockbuster against  he made a scoreboard impact when he kicked two-goals, just his second such haul in his career to-date. McIntosh remained with the senior side for a further eight matches and through to the club's round 14 bye. On the back of three consecutive matches with less than 10 disposals, McIntosh entered the bye averaging the fewest disposals (12.7), second fewest uncontested possessions (8.7) and the second fewest tackles (1.8) of any regularly starting winger in the league. As a result of those performances, McIntosh did not earn senior selection in round 15, instead dropped back to playing reserves football in the VFL. McIntosh's output immediately improved on his early-season form, contributing 14, 20, 13 and 16 disposals in his first four matches back. In round 22 he recorded 20 disposals, but also attracted attention for his involvement in an off-ball incident with Devon Smith in which the  midfielder swung at, and narrowly avoided making contact with, McIntosh's jaw. Smith received only a fine for the incident. After earning a minor premiership with 18 wins in the regular season, McIntosh's side entered the finals series with a qualifying final match-up against . He kicked a career-high three goals in the match and helped the team earn a preliminary final birth. He finished the season having played 21 matches and kicking a career-best nine goals.

2019 season

After being left out of the first, McIntosh started his 2019 season with an appearance in the club's second and final pre-season match before recording 13 disposals and kicking a goal in round 1's season-opening match against . He earned one vote in the Coaches Association player of the year award for that performance, one of just six players on the ground to receive votes. McIntosh repeated the feat in round 8, earning two more coaches votes while kicking one goal in a win against  in his home state. Though the first 13 rounds of the season, McIntosh was one of just four Richmond players to play in all matches that year. Despite that run, McIntosh would be dropped down to reserves level following a 12 disposal performance against the Giants in round 17. He would remain at the lower level through the beginning of the VFL finals series, building versatility by trialing as a defender in an ultimately failed attempt to break back into the senior side in the final month of the season. McIntosh played both as a defender and in his usual wing role for the Richmond reserves' first VFL finals match, recording eight disposals in a come-from-behind qualifying final win over the  reserves. In the VFL preliminary final a fortnight later he posted 15 disposals as Richmond's reserves defeated Port Melbourne and won through to that league's grand final. When Jack Graham and Nathan Broad suffered a shoulder dislocation and concussion respectively in the AFL preliminary final the next week, McIntosh was considered a possible replacement for either should they prove unable to play in the upcoming AFL grand final. As a result, he was held out from playing in the club's victorious VFL grand final two days later. Broad was ruled fit to play, while Marlion Pickett was called in to replace Graham, leaving McIntosh overlooked for a call up to what would be an AFL premiership winning side. He was instead named an emergency, ultimately becoming one of just six players on the Richmond list to play in neither the AFL nor VFL premiership winning sides that season. McIntosh finished 2019 by placing 15th in the club's best and fairest count after played 16 matches at AFL level as well as five with the club's reserves side in the VFL. Despite off-season media speculation that he could seek a trade away from Richmond due to his failure to play finals football, McIntosh remained with the club through the trade period and into the 2020 pre-season without any trade being seriously explored.

2020 season
During a pre-season training camp on the Gold Coast in January 2020, McIntosh suffered a series syndesmosis ankle injury in his right foot. Though surgery was not required, McIntosh would miss five weeks of training in order to repair the injury and was slated to return to fitness before the club's final pre-season series match. While he missed this target, he did manage to participate in a VFL practice match in the first week March and was scheduled to play in another the following week that was eventually cancelled due to safety concerns as a result of the rapid progression of the coronavirus pandemic into Australia. McIntosh could not earn selection to AFL level when the season began a week later, and was instead a non-playing emergency for the win over  that was played without crowds in attendance due to public health prohibitions on large gatherings. In what was the first of what the league planned would be a reduced 17-round season, the match was also played with quarter lengths reduced by one fifth in order to reduce the physical load on players who would be expected to play multiple matches with short breaks in the second half of the year. Just three days later, the AFL Commission suspended the season for an indefinite period after multiple states enforced quarantine conditions on their borders that effectively ruled out the possibility of continuing the season as planned. McIntosh was a non-playing emergency when the season resumed in June after an 11-week hiatus, instead getting his first competitive play of the season in an unofficial scratch match against 's reserves the following week after all AFL clubs' withdrawal from the VFL season. Despite what Fox Sports called a "poor" performance in his return to AFL level, McIntosh held his place over the coming weeks including after the club and all its Victorian counterparts were relocated to the Gold Coast in response to a virus outbreak in Melbourne. He continued to hold his spot over the remainder of the regular season, kicking three goals across the final six matches of the season including one kicked in a second-best on ground performance against  that earned him four coaches votes. In addition to his premiership silverware, McIntosh earned the Kevin Bartlett medal for a career-best fifth place finish in the club's best and fairest count, despite playing just 18 of a possible 21 matches that season.

Player profile
McIntosh plays as a winger, but has previously also played as a half-back. He is notable for his physical attributes including his running ability and his relative strength and body size for someone in his playing position.

Statistics
Updated to the end of round 23, 2022.

|-
| 2013
|
| 33 || 0 || — || — || — || — || — || — || — || — || — || — || — || — || — || — || —
|-
| 2014
|
| 33 || 0 || — || — || — || — || — || — || — || — || — || — || — || — || — || — || —
|-
| 2015
|
| 33 || 23 || 8 || 8 || 242 || 111 || 353 || 94 || 60 || 0.3 || 0.3 || 10.5 || 4.8 || 15.3 || 4.1 || 2.6 || 2
|-
| 2016
|
| 33 || 6 || 0 || 1 || 73 || 35 || 108 || 30 || 14 || 0.0 || 0.2 || 12.2 || 5.8 || 18.0 || 5.0 || 2.3 || 0
|-
| scope=row bgcolor=F0E68C | 2017#
|
| 33 || 24 || 2 || 5 || 231 || 127 || 358 || 85 || 76 || 0.1 || 0.2 || 9.6 || 5.3 || 14.9 || 3.5 || 3.2 || 0
|-
| 2018
|
| 33 || 21 || 9 || 3 || 198 || 94 || 292 || 66 || 43 || 0.4 || 0.1 || 9.4 || 4.5 || 13.9 || 3.1 || 2.0 || 0
|-
| 2019
|
| 33 || 16 || 7 || 3 || 152 || 74 || 226 || 64 || 46 || 0.4 || 0.2 || 9.5 || 4.6 || 14.1 || 4.0 || 2.9 || 0
|-
| scope=row bgcolor=F0E68C | 2020#
|
| 33 || 18 || 6 || 4 || 165 || 79 || 244 || 68 || 30 || 0.3 || 0.2 || 9.2 || 4.4 || 13.6 || 3.8 || 1.7 || 0
|-
| 2021
|
| 33 || 17 || 1 || 4 || 182 || 81 || 263 || 69 || 41 || 0.1 || 0.2 || 10.7 || 4.8 || 15.5 || 4.1 || 2.4 || 0
|-
| 2022
|
| 33 || 20 || 8 || 2 || 224 || 99 || 323 || 100 || 39 || 0.4 || 0.1 || 11.2 || 5.0 || 16.2 || 5.0 || 2.0 ||
|- class="sortbottom"
! colspan=3| Career
! 145
! 41
! 30
! 1467
! 700
! 2167
! 576
! 349
! 0.3
! 0.2
! 10.1
! 4.8
! 14.9
! 4.0
! 2.4
! 2
|}

Notes

Honours and achievements
AFL (Team)
 AFL premiership player: 2017, 2020
 McClelland Trophy: 2018

AFL (Individual)
AFL Rising Star nominee: 2015
Cosgrove-Jenkins Award (Richmond best first-year player): 2015

References

External links

 
 
 Kamdyn McIntosh's statistics from Footy Wire

Living people
1994 births
Australian rules footballers from Western Australia
Richmond Football Club players
Richmond Football Club Premiership players
Peel Thunder Football Club players
Two-time VFL/AFL Premiership players